Case Closed: Zero the Enforcer, known as  in Japan, is a 2018 Japanese anime film directed by Yuzuru Tachikawa and written by Takeharu Sakurai. It was the twenty-second installment of the Case Closed film series based on the manga series of the same name by Gosho Aoyama, following the 2017 film Case Closed: The Crimson Love Letter. The film was released on April 13, 2018 and has grossed over  worldwide. It is the second highest-grossing Case Closed film of all time.

Plot
Located in Tokyo Bay, the newly built integrated resort and convention center "Edge of Ocean" is going to host an upcoming Summit Meeting.  Prior to the Summit, an explosion went off at one of the buildings, killing and injuring many Public Security Bureau personnel performing inspection there, including Amuro Tōru and Kazami Yūya. A preliminary investigation found the fingerprint which matches the Mori Kogoro's, and with other evidence purportedly located inside Kogoro's computer, Kogoro is arrested. After a hopeless search for a lawyer who is willing to represent Kogoro in the trial, Ran, Kisaki Eri, and Conan encountered a freelance lawyer, Tachibana Kyōko, who offered to represent Kogoro in the case.

Meanwhile, the Office of the Attorney-General believes that the evidence incriminating Kogoro is sufficient to build the case, and Iwai Sayoko, the Attorney-General, instructed Kusakabe Makoto to prosecute Kogoro. At the same time, the police investigation of the case is ongoing, and it was discovered that the gas valve and pressurized cooker can be connected to the internet (Internet of Things (IoT)) and that the two was remotely accessed via Nor (resembling Tor) through Kogoro's device to cause the explosion. On the day of the conference, people are experiencing strange cases of IoT devices malfunctioning, causing electrical short circuit and fire around Tokyo. At that time, Kogoro was being held in Tokyo Penitentiary, which means Kogoro could not have been the culprit in the bombing and the IoT attack, and the case against him was dropped.

On the date the unmanned Martian mission craft called "Hakuchō" is scheduled to land, Conan deducted the identity of the culprit of the bombing and IoT attack, the prosecutor Makoto Kusakabe. Kusakabe employed an assistant named Haba Fumikazu, who previously worked with and fall in love with Tachibana. During the investigation by Kusakabe, Haba discovered that the culprit that hacks into the system of NAZU (resembling NASA) are working in a game company. Haba was arrested for breaking into the game company and was presumed dead after the interrogation by Amuro, causing Kusakabe to exact revenge on the Public Security Bureau. Amuro then revealed that Haba's death was faked to ensure that the public prosecutor will not employ the help of the assistant in the same manner as he did to Haba again.

However, Kusakabe already hacked into the system to change the projectile of the capsule launched from Hakuchō to crash to the Tokyo Metropolitan Police building, but he causes blackout at the building and initiates the IoT attack at the nearby vicinity to allow police personnel and other residents to be evacuated to the Edge of Ocean. Although Kusakabe relented and gave up the access code, it was almost too late, and Conan and Amuro employed help from Dr. Agasa, Haibara and the Detective Boys to detonate the bomb using a drone built by Dr. Agasa near the capsule in order for the capsule to fall into the harmless spot. With the point of impact being the casino tower at the Edge of Ocean, Amuro and Conan race against time and traffic to allow Conan to shoot the ball to deflect the capsule, and the capsule falls harmlessly into the water.

Cast

Production
Case Closed: Zero the Enforcer was directed by Yuzuru Tachikawa. It is the first film to feature the character Tōru Amuro since 2016's Case Closed: The Darkest Nightmare and the first to feature Hyōe Kuroda. The film's theme song is  performed by Masaharu Fukuyama.

The film was dubbed in English by Bang Zoom! Entertainment, marking the first official English dub of a Case Closed film since 2010. The dub uses the original Japanese character names (ex. "Shinichi Kudō", "Ran Mōri") instead of the Americanized names (ex. "Jimmy Kudo", "Rachel Moore") that Funimation and Viz Media use in the anime and manga respectively.

Release
The English dub was first shown in the United Arab Emirates with Arabic subtitles before being shown in America at the 2019 Anime Expo using 4DX technology. On June 30, 2020, TMS announced on Twitter an English Blu-ray release slated for September, which was released on September 29, 2020 by Discotek Media. The film is also available for digital streaming on Amazon Prime Video.

Box office 
Debuting on 384 screens with Toho distributing, Case Closed: Zero the Enforcer earned  from 1.012million admissions in its first weekend and ranked number-one at the Japanese box office. The 22nd Case Closed feature film earned  from its domestic run, becoming the 9th highest-grossing anime film of all time, and the top-grossing film in the Case Closed anime franchise, surpassing the 21st film The Crimson Love Letter which grossed  in 2017.

References

External links

Conan Movie Website

Detective Conan: Zero the Enforcer Box Office Mojo

2018 films
2018 anime films
Zero the Enforcer
Discotek Media
TMS Entertainment
Toho animated films